Still Waiting may refer to:

 "Still Waiting" (Prince song)
 "Still Waiting" (Sum 41 song)
 "Still Waiting", a Tom Chaplin song from The Wave
 "Still Waiting" (Uncanny X-Men song)
 Still Waiting..., a 2009 sequel to the film Waiting...

See also
 I'm Still Waiting (disambiguation)
 Waiting (disambiguation)